Grit Breuer (later Springstein, born 16 February 1972 in Röbel, Bezirk Neubrandenburg) is a German former athlete, who competed in the women's 200 metres, 400 metres, 4×100 m relay, and 4×400 m relay events.

She has received injuries as a result of her sports competition, including a slipped disk in her back and a ligament in her knee. She has also been involved in drugs-related controversy. In 1992 she received a two-year ban from the sport after admitting she had taken clenbuterol. In 2004, she was accused of skipping a drug test in South Africa, but she was cleared on a technicality. She has won two Olympic bronze medals in the 4 × 400 metres relay. Her first was in 1988 competing for East Germany, when she ran in the heats but not the final and the second was in 1996.

Sports accomplishments

See also 
 Doping cases in athletics

References

External links
 East Germany's Doping Legacy Returns

1972 births
Living people
People from Mecklenburgische Seenplatte (district)
People from Bezirk Neubrandenburg
German female sprinters
East German female sprinters
Sportspeople from Mecklenburg-Western Pomerania
Olympic athletes of East Germany
Olympic athletes of Germany
Athletes (track and field) at the 1988 Summer Olympics
Athletes (track and field) at the 1996 Summer Olympics
Athletes (track and field) at the 2004 Summer Olympics
World Athletics Championships athletes for Germany
Doping cases in athletics
Olympic bronze medalists for Germany
World Athletics Championships medalists
European Athletics Championships medalists
Medalists at the 1996 Summer Olympics
Medalists at the 1988 Summer Olympics
Olympic bronze medalists in athletics (track and field)
German national athletics champions
Recipients of the Silver Laurel Leaf
Olympic bronze medalists for East Germany
World Athletics Indoor Championships medalists
World Athletics Indoor Championships winners
World Athletics Championships winners
Olympic female sprinters